CSMU is the abbreviation, which may refer to:

 Crimea State Medical University named after S. I. Georgievsky - medical university in Simferopol, Ukraine
 Chung Shan Medical University - medical university in Taichung City, Taiwan
 Crash Survivable Memory Unit - a resilient storage medium used in military aircraft